Felipe Valério Paschoal (born 8 July 1993) is a Brazilian futsal player who plays as a winger for ElPozo Murcia and the Brazilian national futsal team.

References

External links
Liga Nacional de Futsal profile
ZeroZero profile

1993 births
Living people
Brazilian expatriate sportspeople in Spain
Brazilian men's futsal players